Henri "Rie" Meert was a Belgian international football player who was born 27 August 1920 in Schaerbeek (Belgium) and died 19 May 2006 in Anderlecht.

He was the goalkeeper of Sporting Anderlecht in the entire 1950s; eight times he took home the Belgian Championship with the Mauves. He played 343 official matches (among which 312 in the first division) for the club and appeared 33 times in the national selection.

Player palmares

Club career 
 Belgian First Division
Winner in the years 1947, 1949-1951, 1954-1956 and 1959 with Anderlecht

International career 
 33 selections for the Belgium national team

References

External links
 

1920 births
2006 deaths
Belgian footballers
R.S.C. Anderlecht players
Belgium international footballers
Belgian Pro League players
Footballers from Brussels

Association football forwards